Alfred Girard,  (August 4, 1859 – February 17, 1919) was a Canadian lawyer and politician.

Born in Sainte-Marie-de-Monnoir, Quebec, the son of Pierre Girard and Marie Pelletier, Girard began his education at Marieville College, and afterwards passed a course in Sherbrooke College, finally graduating in law at McGill College in 1882, when he received his B.C.L. He was called to the Quebec Bar in 1882 and began practicing law in Marieville, Quebec. He eventually moved to Montreal where he practiced law. He was created a King's Counsel in 1903.

He was elected to the Legislative Assembly of Quebec in the 1890 election for the riding of Rouville. A Liberal, he was re-elected in 1892 but was defeated in 1897. He was re-elected again in 1900, acclaimed in 1904, and re-elected in 1908. He resigned in 1908 after being appointed to the Montreal Superior Court.

References
 

1859 births
1919 deaths
Lawyers in Quebec
Quebec Liberal Party MNAs
Canadian King's Counsel
McGill University Faculty of Law alumni